Two Confessions is a 1957 Hungarian crime film directed by Márton Keleti. It was entered into the 1957 Cannes Film Festival.

Cast
 Mari Törőcsik - Erzsi
 Marianne Krencsey - Ibi
 Lajos Őze - Sándor
 Kálmán Koletár - Jóska
 Ferenc Ladányi - Vincze százados
 Andor Ajtay - Biró
 Béla Barsi
 Margit Makay - Sándor nagyanyja
 Gábor Mádi Szabó - Kerékpáros rendőr
 Erzsi Máthé - Erzsi anyja
 Mária Mezei - Ibi anyja
 János Rajz - Józsi bácsi
 Nusi Somogyi
 József Timár - Vedres
 Tivadar Uray - Sándor apja
 György Bárdy - Inspector
 Gyula Benkő - Nyomozó
 Tibor Molnár
 István Szatmári - Nyomozó

References

External links

1957 films
1957 crime films
1950s Hungarian-language films
Hungarian black-and-white films
Films directed by Márton Keleti
Hungarian crime films